Mount Cruiser is a 6,104-foot-elevation (1,860 meter) mountain summit located in the Olympic Mountains, in Mason County of Washington state. It is situated in Mount Skokomish Wilderness on land managed by Olympic National Forest. Cruiser is the highest point on Sawtooth Ridge, and its nearest higher peak is Mount Skokomish,  to the north-northeast. Cruiser has two sub-peaks, Alpha (6040 ft/1841 m), and Beta (5920 ft/1804 m), the latter of which lies on the Olympic National Park boundary. The first ascent of the peak was made in 1937 by Paul Crews and Ray Layton. The mountain was named by the first ascent party to recognize their club, the Bremerton Ski Cruisers. The mountain's name was officially adopted in 1961 by the United States Board on Geographic Names. Precipitation runoff from the mountain drains into the Hamma Hamma River.

Climate

Mount Cruiser is located in the marine west coast climate zone of western North America. Most weather fronts originate in the Pacific Ocean, and travel northeast toward the Olympic Mountains. As fronts approach, they are forced upward by the peaks of the Olympic Range, causing them to drop their moisture in the form of rain or snowfall (Orographic lift). As a result, the Olympics experience high precipitation, especially during the winter months. During winter months, weather is usually cloudy, but, due to high pressure systems over the Pacific Ocean that intensify during summer months, there is often little or no cloud cover during the summer. Because of maritime influence, snow tends to be wet and heavy, resulting in avalanche danger. The months June through September offer the most favorable weather for climbing.

Geology

The Olympic Mountains are composed of obducted clastic wedge material and oceanic crust, primarily Eocene sandstone, turbidite, and basaltic oceanic crust. The mountains were sculpted during the Pleistocene era by erosion and glaciers advancing and retreating multiple times.

Climbing Routes

Established rock climbing routes on Mt. Cruiser:

 South Corner - 
 West-Southwest Corner - class 5.7 
 Northeast Face - class 5.6 
 West Face - class 5.5
 East Face - class 5.7
 Southeast Face - class 5.5

See also

 Geology of the Pacific Northwest
 Mount Lincoln

References

External links

 Weather: Mount Cruiser
 Mount Skokomish Wilderness U.S. Forest Service
 PBase photo: Cruiser winter aerial

Olympic Mountains
Landforms of Mason County, Washington
Mountains of Washington (state)
Olympic National Forest
North American 1000 m summits